Tŝ’ilʔoŝ, also known as Mount Tatlow, is one of the principal summits of the Chilcotin Ranges subdivision of the Pacific Ranges of the Coast Mountains of southern British Columbia.

Southeast across the Taseko Lakes is Taseko Mountain , the highest summit between those lakes and the Fraser River, while directly south beyond Yohetta Valley (a deep valley which connects the relative lowlands around Chilko and Taseko Lakes is the massif containing Monmouth Mountain . Southwest across Chilko Lake is Mount Good Hope  and due west, also across Chilko Lake, is Mount Queen Bess , the highest peak east of the Homathko River before the Waddington Range massif, which is at the core of the range and contains Mount Waddington .

Name 
The name Mount Tatlow was officially adopted on 26 June 1911, as submitted on 23 June 1910 by Sidney Williams, and on 11 March 2019, the official name became Tŝ'ilʔoŝ as recommended by Tŝilhqot’in National Government and supported by the Cariboo Regional District, BC Parks, Avalanche Canda, and Recreation Sites and Trails.

Tŝ’ilʔoŝ (tsyle-oss, the 'ʔ' represents a glottal stop) is the traditional name in the language of the Tsilhqot'in people whose territory is in the area of the lakes and the plateau to their north, and has given its name to Tsʼilʔos Provincial Park which encompasses this area.  Native tradition holds that it is unlucky to point at Tŝ’ilʔoŝ, or to mention its name in casual speech; adverse weather and worse may result.  The Xeni Gwet'in people, who reside in Nemaia Valley near Tŝ’ilʔoŝ, request that NO climbing of it and its neighbouring summits take place, and BC Parks imposes those rules in its land-use guidelines on the area.

See also
 Mountain peaks of Canada
 Mountain peaks of North America
 Tsʼilʔos Provincial Park
 Geography of British Columbia

References

External links
 "Mount Tatlow, British Columbia" on Peakbagger

Three-thousanders of British Columbia
Chilcotin Ranges
Landforms of the Chilcotin